The Adidas Cup 1999 was the twelfth competition of the Korean League Cup, and one of two Korean League Cups held in 1999. All matches were played without extra time.

Bracket

Matches

First round

Quarter-finals

Semi-finals

Final

Awards

Source:

See also
1999 in South Korean football
1999 Korean League Cup (Supplementary Cup)
1999 K League
1999 Korean FA Cup

References

External links
Official website
RSSSF

1999
1999
1999 domestic association football cups
1999 in South Korean football